Lip'ichi (Aymara for the skin of an animal, also spelled Liphichii) is a mountain in the Bolivian Andes which reaches a height of approximately . It is located in the Cochabamba Department, Ayopaya Province, Ayopaya Municipality. Lip'ichi lies north of the Wila Quta River, southwest of Wila Quta.

References 

Mountains of Cochabamba Department